Croonin' is a studio album by Canadian country vocalist Anne Murray. It was released by EMI Music Canada and SBK Records on November 2, 1993. The album peaked at number 1 on the RPM Country Albums chart. Heartland Records put out a Croonin' album with two bonus tracks, and Murray sings Perry Como's hit "Round and Round" and Dean Martin's hit "Memories Are Made of This." This album was also released on vinyl LP.

Track listing

Personnel 
 Anna Murray – lead and backing vocals 
 Doug Riley – acoustic piano, Fender Rhodes, Hammond B3 organ, string quartet arrangements and conductor (1, 3, 5, 6, 9, 18), oboe arrangements (3, 5)
 Steve Sexton – synthesizers 
 Mike "Pepe" Francis – rhythm electric guitar, rhythm acoustic guitar, classical guitar
 Bob Mann – lead electric guitar, lead acoustic guitar 
 Peter Cardinali – bass, string quartet arrangements and conductor (7, 10, 13, 14, 16, 17), oboe arrangements (13)
 Barry Keane – drums, percussion
 Peter Appleyard – vibraphone
 Brian Leonard – marimba
 Vern Dorge – alto saxophone, soprano saxophone, tenor saxophone 
 Guido Basso – harmonica, flugelhorn 
 Melvin Berman – oboe
 Richard Armin – cello 
 Terrence Helmer – viola 
 Adele Armin – violin
 Vern Tarnowsky – violin 
 Shirley Eikhard – backing vocals 
 Bruce Murray – backing vocals  
 Colina Phillips – backing vocals 
 Debbie Schaal Ankeny – backing vocals 
 Tommy West – backing vocals, lead vocals (9)
 Vivian Williams – backing vocals

Production 
 Balmur Limited – executive producer 
 Tommy West – producer 
 Anne Murray – co-producer 
 Kevin Doyle – recording, mixing 
 Dany Tremblay – recording assistant, mix assistant 
 Bob Ludwig – mastering at Gateway Mastering (Portland, Maine)
 Scott Thornley – art direction, design 
 Denise Grant – photography 
 Lee Kinoshita-Bevington – wardrobe stylist
 Sheila Yakimov – hair stylist 
 George Abbott – make-up

Charts

References

1993 albums
Anne Murray albums
EMI Records albums
SBK Records albums
Traditional pop albums